Battle of Makwanpur was fought on 28 February 1816 in Makwanpurgadhi, Nepal between Nepal and the East India Company. It resulted in British victory.

References 

Gurkhas
Makwanpur
Makwanpur
Makwanpur
Anglo-Nepalese War
1816 in Nepal
History of Bagmati Province
Makwanpur